The 1950–51 Romanian Hockey League season was the 21st season of the Romanian Hockey League. Eight teams participated in the league, and RATA Targu Mures won the championship.

Playoffs

Quarterfinals
RATA Targu Mures - Locomotive Galati 16:0
Avantul IPEIL Miercurea Ciuc - Locomotive Sighisoara 19:2
Partizanul Bucuresti - Steagul Rosu Brasov 2:0
Stiinta Cluj - ETACS Iasi 21:1

Semifinals
RATA Targu Mures - Partizanul Bucuresti 6:1 (2-0, 2-1, 2-0) L.Incze 3, G.Incze, I.Incze, Fenke - Teodorescu
Avantul IPEIL Miercurea Ciuc - Stiinta Cluj 5:2 (2-1, 2-1, 1-0) Fodor 2, Covaci, Szabo, Czaka - Csacsar, Takacs

Final
RATA Targu Mures - Avantul IPEIL Miercurea Ciuc 4:2 (1-0, 0-0, 3-2) Incze I 3, Fenke - Covaci, Czaka

3rd place
Partizanul Bucuresti - Stiinta Cluj 5:4

RATA Targu Mures: Biro, Kerekes, Fabian, Mogos, Ritz, Culcear, Toganel, Incze I, Incze II, Incze III, Nagy, Martonfi

Avantul IPEIL Miercurea Ciuc: Sprencz, Sentes, Incze, Spirea, Covaci, Fodor, Vakar, Fenke II, Szabo, Czaka, Haidu

Partizanul Bucuresti: Dron, Anastasiu, Marinescu, Dlugosch, Tiron, Flamaropol, Teodorescu, Wanieck, Cosman, Pana, Nimereala, Ardeleanu

External links
hochei.net

Romania
Romanian Hockey League seasons
1950–51 in Romanian ice hockey